In literary criticism, purple prose is overly ornate prose text that may disrupt a narrative flow by drawing undesirable attention to its own extravagant style of writing, thereby diminishing the appreciation of the prose overall. Purple prose is characterized by the excessive use of adjectives, adverbs, and metaphors. When it is limited to certain passages, they may be termed purple patches or purple passages, standing out from the rest of the work.

Purple prose is criticized for desaturating the meaning in an author's text by overusing melodramatic and fanciful descriptions. As there is no precise rule or absolute definition of what constitutes purple prose, deciding if a text, passage, or complete work has fallen victim is a somewhat subjective decision. According to Paul West, "It takes a certain amount of sass to speak up for prose that's rich, succulent and full of novelty. Purple is immoral, undemocratic and insincere; at best artsy, at worst the exterminating angel of depravity."

Origins
The term purple prose is derived from a reference by the Roman poet Horace (Quintus Horatius Flaccus, 65–8 BC) who wrote in his Ars Poetica (lines 14–21):

See also
 Description, one of four rhetorical modes, along with exposition, argumentation, and narration
 Bulwer-Lytton Fiction Contest, to find "the opening sentence to the worst of all possible novels"
 Elegant variation, unnecessary use of synonyms
 Euphuism, deliberate excess of literary devices fashionable in 1580s English prose
 Order of the Occult Hand, smuggles the phrase "It was as if an occult hand had…" into published copy

Notes

References 
 Coles Editorial Board, Dictionary of Literary Terms, Rama Brothers, 2001.

Narratology
Fiction
Style (fiction)
Fiction-writing mode
Descriptive technique
Horace